The Gallant Bloom Handicap is a Grade III American Thoroughbred horse race for fillies and mares that are three years old and older run over a distance of  furlongs on the dirt held annually in late September at Belmont Park in Elmont, New York.

History
The event is named in honor of Gallant Bloom who won the Eclipse Award for Outstanding Two-Year-Old Filly champion of 1968, the 1969 American Champion Three-Year-Old Filly and the 1969 American Champion Older Female Horse.  In The Blood-Horse ranking of the top 100 U.S. thoroughbred champions of the 20th Century, Gallant Bloom is ranked #79.

The event was inaugurated on 30 August 1992 at Saratoga Race Course as a three-year-old fillies race over six furlongs. and was won by the Canadian bred filly Apelia who defeated the Grade I Frizette Stakes winner Preach by  lengths. Later, in 2014 Apelia would be honored into the Canadian Horse Racing Hall of Fame.

The following year the event was not held but was resumed in 1994 at Belmont Park with handicap conditions for three-year-old and older fillies and mares to enter. In 1995 the distance of the event was increased to  furlongs.

In 1997 the event was classified as Grade III and was upgraded to Grade II in 2001.

The quality of the entrants for the event has justified its high status. The 2007 Breeders' Cup Juvenile Fillies winner Indian Blessing won this event twice and is the only dual winner to date. In 2008 Indian Blessing went onto be crowned American Champion Female Sprint Horse.

In 2022 the event was moved to Aqueduct Racetrack due to infield tunnel and redevelopment work at Belmont Park.

Records
Speed record:
  furlongs: 1:14.71 – Dust and Diamonds (2012)

Margins:
  lengths –  Frank's Rockette   (2020)

Most wins:
 2 – Indian Blessing (2008, 2009)

Most wins by a jockey:
 5 – John Velazquez (1997, 2001, 2004, 2009, 2016)

Most wins by a trainer:
 4 – Steven Asmussen (2004, 2012, 2013, 2018)

Most wins by an owner:
 2 – Patti & Hal Earnhardt III (2008, 2009)
 2 – Mary & Chester Broman Sr. (2014, 2017)

Winners

See also
 List of American and Canadian Graded races

References

Graded stakes races in the United States
Sprint category horse races for fillies and mares
Horse races in New York (state)
Belmont Park
Recurring sporting events established in 1992
1992 establishments in New York (state)
Grade 2 stakes races in the United States